A special election was held in  on October 8, 1805 to fill a vacancy left by the death of John A. Hanna (DR) on July 23, 1805, before the first session of the 9th Congress.

Election results 

Whitehall took his seat December 2, 1805

See also
 List of special elections to the United States House of Representatives

References

Pennsylvania 1805 04
Pennsylvania 1805 04
1805 04
Pennsylvania 04
United States House of Representatives 04
United States House of Representatives 1805 04